Noctepuna muensis is a species of air-breathing land snail, a terrestrial pulmonate gastropod mollusc in the family Camaenidae. This species is endemic to Australia.

References

Camaenidae
Gastropods described in 1912
Endemic fauna of Australia
Taxonomy articles created by Polbot